Branko Bošnjak (14 January 1923 – 18 June 1996) was a Croatian philosopher, member of the Praxis school in the former Yugoslavia. Bošnjak was a professor at the Faculty of Philosophy at the University of Zagreb and for a period a head of the Department for History of Philosophy and a dean of the faculty. He was a member of the Croatian Academy of Sciences and Arts. He died in Zagreb and was buried in Mirogoj Cemetery.

Major works
Bošnjak's main fields of interest were religion and history of philosophy. His major works are:
History of Philosophy as a Science (1958)
Logos and Dialectics (1961)
Philosophy and Christianity (1966)
The Greek Philosophical Criticism on the Bible (1971)
The Meaning of the Philosophical Existence (1981)
Philosophy and History (1983)
History of Philosophy (1993)

External links
Preface to Philosophy and Christianity  
The Meaning of the Philosophical Existence 
The Truth and the Trained Thought 

Croatian atheists
Academic staff of the University of Zagreb
Members of the Croatian Academy of Sciences and Arts
Burials at Mirogoj Cemetery
1923 births
1996 deaths
20th-century Croatian philosophers
Yugoslav philosophers